In abstract algebra, a rupture field of a polynomial  over a given field  is a field extension of  generated by a root  of .

For a field containing all the roots of a polynomial, see Splitting field.

Examples
It is also a splitting field.

See also
 Splitting field

References

Field (mathematics)